A Paramedic in Australia is a health care professional who holds a minimum of a Bachelor's Degree in Paramedicine and is registered with the Paramedicine Board of Australia via the Australian Health Practitioners Regulation Agency (AHPRA)  As of December 2021, there are over 22,500 registered paramedics in Australia, of which approximately 70% (15,750) work for a jurisdictional  service (each of which covers an entire state or territory), and of which 47% of which are female. Paramedics in Australia may undergo further training and complete a Master's Degree to specialise in either Intensive Care or Primary Care medicine.

Regulation

From 1 December 2018, Paramedicine in Australia became regulated under the Paramedicine Board of Australia (who are supported in their function by AHPRA, the national body which administers the registration scheme), and the titles "Paramedic" and "Paramedicine" are legally restricted to registered practitioners. Initial registration requires holding an approved qualification and being deemed suitable under the standards of criminal history, English language skills, professional indemnity insurance, and recency of practice.  Annual re-registration additionally requires completion of 30 hours continual professional development.  All registered paramedics are publicly visible and able to be searched on the AHPRA registry of practitioners.

Education and training

Undergraduates 
Registration as a Paramedic requires completion of an approved qualification recognised by AHPRA.  Currently, 15 universities offer undergraduate Bachelor degrees recognised by AHPRA:

 Monash University
 Griffith University
 Queensland University of Technology
 University of the Sunshine Coast
 University of Tasmania
 Australian Catholic University
 Central Queensland University
 Charles Sturt University
 Curtin University
 Edith Cowan University
 Flinders University
 La Trobe University
 University of Southern Queensland
 Victoria University
 Western Sydney University

Entry to undergraduate degrees remains competitive, with a mean entry ATAR of 83.2 in 2021. Some paramedic degrees are dual (that is, combined with another discipline, for example Bachelor of Paramedicine/Bachelor of Nursing). In 2021 there were approximately 8,000 Bachelor's Degree paramedicine students in Australia, with a significant surplus of graduates to recruitment within the jurisdictional services, leading to increased recruitment in other health services such as GP clinics and Emergency Departments.

Undergraduate degrees involve three years of full-time study, consisting of three core elements: traditional academic coursework, practical simulations, and placement.  Academic coursework involves anatomy, physiology, pathology, pharmacology, resuscitation, traumatology, cardiology, pulmonology, neurology, paediatrics, obstetrics, and mental health, with less detailed study of gastroenterology, toxicology, and endocrinology.  Assessment for academic coursework is via essays and closed-book written exams.  Practical simulations (commonly called 'pracs') are aligned to match the current academic topics, and provide a setting to practice skills such as laryngoscopy, ventilation, resuscitation, and delivery.  Assessment for practical classes is, as with medicine and nursing, via Objective Structured Clinical Examinations (OSCEs), usually with the local state clinical practice guidelines as the marking criteria.  Placement is not assessed, and requires simply attending rostered shifts accompanying on-road paramedics.  The placement conditions vary by state, but generally involve several hundred hours of unpaid shift work.  Due to the nature of paramedicine, students on placement regularly are required to assist with patient treatment under the supervision of qualified paramedics.

Paramedics are generally not able to practice autonomously following completion of an undergraduate degree, with most services requiring completion of a  12-month graduate program with supervision and additional assessment (colloquially referred to as a 'grad year').

Postgraduate qualifications
A Master's Degree is generally mandatory to progress to specialisation as an Intensive Care or Primary Care paramedic, and is usually funded by the employer.  Doctoral studies are growing in paramedicine, and are offered at multiple universities.

Employment 
As of December 2021, there are over 22,500 registered paramedics in Australia, of which approximately 70% (15,750) work for a state service.  With the exception of the Northern Territory and Western Australia, all services are government agencies, and are commonly collectively referred to as the jurisdictional ambulance services (JASs).  The services had a collective budget of over $4 billion AUD in 2021.  The eight state services are:

 Ambulance Tasmania
 Ambulance Victoria
 Australian Capital Territory Ambulance Service
 New South Wales Ambulance 
 Queensland Ambulance Service
 SA Ambulance Service
 St John Northern Territory
 St John Western Australia

Employment outside the state services is not subject to routine data collection, and there is limited accurate information available to summarise these roles.

Clinical scope of practice

Although paramedics are legally given autonomous authority to practice by their registration, in practice as a public service employee a paramedic's interventions (skills and medications they are allowed to perform) are determined by their employer.  Scope of practice varies by jurisdiction, but broadly involves three levels:

 Generalist paramedics (Bachelor's Degree)
 Intensive Care or Extended Care paramedics (Master's Degree) 
 Additional scopes of practice
Generalist paramedics are Bachelor's Degree trained paramedics who hold AHPRA registration and who have completed a 12-month on-road graduate year.  They make up the majority of practicing paramedics, with a scope of care focused on resuscitation, assessment, analgesia, cardiology, and pulmonology. Generalist paramedics can undertake additional postgraduate training to qualify as an Extended Care or Intensive Care paramedic.

Extended Care paramedics (ECPs), also sometimes known as Community paramedics (CPs) or Local Area Assessment and Referral Unit (LARUs) provide additional primary care skills, with the specific goal of avoiding unnecessary transportation for patients to increase efficiency.

Intensive care paramedics (ICPs), less commonly known as Critical care paramedics (CCPs) or Mobile intensive care ambulance paramedics (MICAs) provide additional critical care skills, generally on airway management, cardiology, and sedation.  ICPs most commonly operate solo out of an SUV and do not transport patients themselves, instead assisting generalist crews as required.

Beyond Extended Care and Intensive Care paramedics, most services additionally have a third-tier clinical level, usually reserved for Helicopter Emergency Medical Services (HEMS) paramedics, commonly called Flight Paramedics.  Additional qualifications for this level vary; in some services a Graduate Diploma is required, while in others a second Master's Degree is undertaken (for a total of 7 years' university, including previous qualifications).  As well as having a helicopter as their vehicle instead of a car, Flight Paramedics also usually have additional skills to facilitate stabilisaiton of the patient prior to helicopter transportation.  This usually includes administration of blood products, pressors, mechanical ventilation, finger thoracostomy, and ultrasonography.  In Western Australia, the Northern Territory, South Australia, and Victoria Flight Paramedics usually work autonomously, while in ACT, NSW, Queensland, and Tasmania they usually accompany a critical care doctor.  Flight responses generally fall into two categories: a primary rescue (where the helicopter vehicle is required to access the patient - such as for winching - or transport larger distances) or a primary retrieval (where the additional skills or medications of a Flight Paramedic are required for stabilisation of the patient).

An example of the types of skills and medications often authorised by employers to the different paramedic clinical levels is provided in the table below:

Unlike in the United Kingdom, the role of Paramedic Practitioner does not exist in Australia.  While paramedics are legally allowed to work independently (i.e. open their own clinic), in practice this is not realistic as paramedics do not have prescription rights, medication ordering rights, or access to bill via the national healthcare system.

Clinical practice guidelines 

All jurisdictional services in Australia utilise clinical practice guidelines (CPGs) to determine a paramedic's scope of practice.  Unlike in nursing and medicine, adhering to the CPGs is often regarded as pivotal, and new paramedics may be expected to memorise all their CPGs.  Cases are routinely audited, and variations from CPGs usually result in a paramedic being formally asked to explain their reasoning behind the variation, and in some cases disciplinary action.  Additionally, universities usually use the local CPG as an assessment tool during OSCEs.  All 8 state service CPGs are openly available.

With the exception of a sharing agreement between Ambulance Victoria and Ambulance Tasmania (where Tasmania pay a nominal annual licensing fee to use Ambulance Victoria's CPGs, which are then modified as appropriate for Tasmanian requirements), CPGs are developed largely in isolation by each individual service.

Professional organisations

Colleges 
Australia's primary college for paramedics is the Australasian College of Paramedicine (ACP).  In 2019, a group of paramedics founded a subset college specialising in low acuity medicine,  the Australasian College of Paramedic Practitioners (ACPP).  There is no high acuity medicine college.  Unlike in medicine, membership of a college is not a prerequisite to specialisation, and colleges do not authorise training programs nor assess candidates for clinical skills.  The role of the colleges is a combination of providing continual professional development (of which 30 hours per year is required to maintain registration with AHPRA) opportunities via education and conferences, advocacy, and funding research.

Unions 
Paramedics are encouraged to join unions by employers, and union-employer bargaining is the primary determinant of Enterprise Bargaining Agreements that determine pay and work conditions.  Industrial representation varies from state to state. Registered paramedic unions in Australia include Ambulance Employees Australia (AEA) and the Health Services Union. Unregistered organisations include Australian Paramedics Associations (APA), Victorian Ambulance Union (VAU), and the Emergency Medical Services Protection Association (EMSPA), and the Emergency Medical Services Protection Association (EMSPA).

References

External links

 Australasian College of Paramedicine

Emergency medical services in Australia